Matthew Battles (born 1968) is a writer, artist, and since 2022 the editor of Harvard’s Arnold Arboretum magazine, Arnoldia. Until 2022 he was the associate director of metaLAB at Harvard University. He has written for The Atlantic, NeimanLab, Harper's Magazine and the New York Times. Battles is the author or co-author of six books, most of which are on the topics of writing or libraries. He was named a Library Journal Mover and Shaker in 2004. He has been called "a gifted stylist" by the Christian Science Monitor which commended his "beautiful writing about writing."

Battles also sees the institution of the library as more than just the building's contents. He headed a team which created a data visualization of the printing locations of books published in early-modern Europe, shown over time. He also worked with artist Sarah Newman on the video installation Your Story Has Touched My Heart which drew heavily on Harvard's photo archives. His "feral copyright project" at metaLAB looked into how copyright is lived and understood by regular people. In 2020 metaLAB (at) Harvard colleague Kim Albrecht published with Battles Their Names a visualization on fatal police encounters.

Personal life

Battles was raised in raised in Petersburg, Illinois. He received a B.A. in anthropology from the University of Chicago in 1992, and an M.A. in creative writing from Boston University in 1996. He is married and has one son and one daughter.

Bibliography
 Library: an Unquiet History (Norton, 2003)
 Widener: Biography of a Library (Widener Library, 2004)
 The Sovereignties of Invention (Red Lemonade, 2012)
 The Library Beyond the Book (with Jeffrey Schnapp, 2014)
 Palimpsest: A History of the Written Word (Norton, 2015)
 TREE (Bloomsbury, 2017)

References

Cultural historians
Harvard University faculty
Living people
American non-fiction writers
American literary critics
Historians of libraries
1968 births